The American Business Journal is a monthly digital publication for senior executives in the United States who want to stay informed of current business topics and trends. The ABJ features articles and columns from writers focused on all aspects of the American business landscape and includes a monthly section 'American Business in Action' that produces corporate case studies highlighting successful American enterprises. Subscription is free. The magazine is based in Mississauga, Ontario.

History and profile
The ABJ was first published on September 30, 2009. It is published by George Media Inc., and is part of the George Media Network, including sister publications The African Business Journal, The Canadian Business Journal, The International Resource Journal and The Australian Business Journal. Leadership consists of Chief Executive and founder of George Media, Michael Alexander-Jones and editor-in-chief, Angus Gillespie.

Distribution and reach 
As of January 2010, The American Business Journal is sent electronically to 117,000 senior executives that drive America's key business sectors including construction, energy, food & drink, healthcare, manufacturing, supply chain & logistics, and technology. In addition, The ABJ website is accessed by over 150,000 unique monthly visitors.

References

External links
 Official website

2009 establishments in Ontario
Business magazines published in Canada
Monthly magazines published in Canada
Online magazines published in Canada
Magazines established in 2009
Magazines published in Ontario
Mass media in Mississauga